Hyperolius lamottei is a species of frog in the family Hyperoliidae. It is found in Ivory Coast, Guinea, Liberia, Senegal, Sierra Leone, and possibly Guinea-Bissau. Its natural habitats are subtropical or tropical moist lowland forests, moist savanna, subtropical or tropical seasonally wet or flooded lowland grassland, subtropical or tropical high-altitude grassland, swamps, intermittent freshwater lakes, intermittent freshwater marshes, rural gardens, and heavily degraded former forest.

References

lamottei
Amphibians described in 1958
Taxonomy articles created by Polbot